The 25-NB (25x-NBx) series, sometimes alternatively referred to as the NBOMe compounds, is a family of serotonergic psychedelics. They are substituted phenethylamines and were derived from the 2C family. They act as selective agonists of the serotonin 5-HT2A receptor. The 25-NB family is unique relative to other classes of psychedelics in that they are, generally speaking, extremely potent and relatively selective for the 5-HT2A receptor. Use of NBOMe series drugs has caused many deaths and hospitalisations since the drugs popularisation in the 2010s. This is primarily due to their high overdose potential and sellers passing off the compounds in the series as LSD.

Chemical structure
The 25-NB compounds are mostly N-benzylphenethylamines, though in some cases the phenyl ring of the N-benzyl group is replaced by other heterocycles such as thiophene, pyridine, furan, tetrahydrofuran, benzodioxole or naphthalene, among others.

Generally speaking, they have methoxy groups at the 2 and 5 positions of the phenyl ring, a substitution such as a halogen or alkyl group at the 4 position of the phenyl ring, and a methoxy or other substitution (e.g., hydroxyl, fluoro) at the 2 position of the N-benzyl ring. More rarely, other substitution patterns may be present  (see e.g. NBOMe-mescaline, 25G-NBOMe, 2CBFly-NBOMe, 25C-NB3OMe). They differ from the 2C series by the presence of the N-benzyl moiety.

Rarely an alpha-methyl group is present making them N-benzyl amphetamines rather than N-benzyl phenethylamines, but this greatly reduces potency and activity. However in some cases where a side chain methyl group is cyclised back to the ring (e.g. in 2CBCB-NBOMe) or links the two alpha positions (e.g. in DMBMPP), this can improve selectivity for the 5-HT2A receptor subtype.

List of 25-NB derivatives

This list includes notable compounds representative of most of the structural variations that have been explored in this series, but is by no means exhaustive. Many derivatives invented for scientific study into the structure-activity relationships of 5-HT2 receptor agonists have never appeared as designer drugs, while conversely some derivatives that have appeared as designer drugs are structurally novel and of unknown pharmacological activity (e.g. C30-NBOMe, 5-APB-NBOMe).

Similar compounds with related structures are also known including;

Legality

United Kingdom
A large number of substances in the 25-NB class are Class A drugs in the United Kingdom as a result of the N-benzylphenethylamine catch-all clause in the Misuse of Drugs Act 1971 or are otherwise covered by the Psychoactive Substances Act 2016.

See also
 2C family
 DOx family

External links
 VICE In-house Chemist Hamilton Morris on the Dangers of the NBOMe Hallucinogen

References

 
Secondary amines